Tarrant Anderson is an English musician, currently serving as the bass player for Frank Turner's live and studio band, The Sleeping Souls  and is a member of the British rock band Dive Dive. He was previously a member of the British punk band Dustball and is based in Oxford, England. Anderson is a Laney endorsed artist.  He is also a director of the tour bus hire company Vans For Bands Ltd. Frank Turner and The Sleeping Souls won Best Live Act at the Association of Independent Music Awards in 2011 and headlined London's Wembley Arena in April 2012. In July 2012 Frank Turner and The Sleeping Souls played at the Opening Ceremony of the Olympic Games in London. Anderson studied politics at the University of Reading and an MPhil. in Politics at the University of Oxford.

Discography

Dustball
Albums and EPs
 Egg Man Like Your Head (EP) (1997)
 Quality But Hers (1998)
 Sounds All Wrong (EP) (2002)

Singles
 "Senor Nachos" (1997)
 "Like Monkeys Do" (1999)

Dive Dive
Albums and EPs
 Tilting at Windmills (2005)
 Revenge of the Mechanical Dog (2007)
 Liar (EP) (2010)
 Potential (2011)

Singles
 "Good Show" (2004)
 "555 for Film Stars" UK Indie #6 (2005)
 "The Sorry Suitor" UK Indie #10 (2005)
 "The Game" (2007)

Frank Turner
Albums and EPs
 Campfire Punkrock (EP) (2006)
 Poetry of the Deed (2009)
 iTunes Festival: London 2010 (EP) (2010)
 Rock & Roll (EP) (2010)
 England Keep My Bones (2011)
 Tape Deck Heart (2013)
 Positive Songs for Negative People (2015)
 Be More Kind (2018)

Singles
 "The Road" (2009)
 "Poetry of the Deed" (2009)
 "Isabel" (2009)
 "Try This at Home" (2010)
 "I Still Believe" (2010)

References

Living people
English bass guitarists
English male guitarists
Male bass guitarists
People from Oxford
Year of birth missing (living people)